Raymond Murray Cullen (September 20, 1941 – March 14, 2021) was a Canadian professional ice hockey player who played 313 games in the National Hockey League. He played for the Detroit Red Wings, New York Rangers, Minnesota North Stars, and Vancouver Canucks. Prior to joining the NHL, Cullen played several seasons in different minor leagues, being named to the First All-Star Team in his only seasons in both the EHL and CPHL, as well as being named the EHL rookie of the year. He also was the winner of the Dudley "Red" Garrett Memorial Award as the rookie of the year in the American Hockey League in 1964–65. Ray's older brothers, Brian and Barry, also played in the NHL.

Born in St. Catharines, Ontario, Cullen was the owner of Ray Cullen Chevrolet Buick GMC dealership in London, Ontario. He died on March 14, 2021, at the age of 79.

Career statistics

Regular season and playoffs

Awards

EHL

CPHL

AHL

See also
List of family relations in the NHL

References

External links 

1941 births
2021 deaths
Baltimore Clippers players
Buffalo Bisons (AHL) players
Canadian ice hockey centres
Detroit Red Wings players
Sportspeople from St. Catharines
Minnesota North Stars players
New York Rangers players
Pittsburgh Hornets players
St. Catharines Teepees players
Vancouver Canucks players
Ice hockey people from Ontario